Murillo has been the name of a number of steamships.

 , in service with Lamport and Holt 1915–32.
 , in service with Lamport and Holt 1946–52.

Ship names